In graph drawing, the angular resolution of a drawing of a graph is the sharpest angle formed by any two edges that meet at a common vertex of the drawing.

Properties

Relation to vertex degree
 observed that every straight-line drawing of a graph with maximum degree  has angular resolution at most  : if  is a vertex of degree , then the edges incident to  partition the space around  into  wedges with total angle , and the smallest of these wedges must have an angle of at most .

Relation to graph coloring
If  can be colored with  colors, then G may be drawn with angular resolution  , for any  , by assigning distinct colors to the vertices of a regular -gon and placing each vertex of  close to the polygon vertex with the same color. This bound is close to tight: they used the probabilistic method to prove the existence of graphs with maximum degree  whose drawings all have angular resolution .

Existence of optimal drawings
 provided an example showing that there exist graphs that do not have a drawing achieving the maximum possible angular resolution; instead, these graphs have a family of drawings whose angular resolutions tend towards some limiting value without reaching it. Specifically, they exhibited an 11-vertex graph that has drawings of angular resolution   for any  , but that does not have a drawing of angular resolution exactly  .

Special classes of graphs

Trees
Every tree may be drawn in such a way that the edges are equally spaced around each vertex, a property known as perfect angular resolution. Moreover, if the edges may be freely permuted around each vertex, then such a drawing is possible, without crossings, with all edges unit length or higher, and with the entire drawing fitting within a bounding box of polynomial area. However, if the cyclic ordering of the edges around each vertex is already determined as part of the input to the problem, then achieving perfect angular resolution with no crossings may sometimes require exponential area.

Outerplanar graphs
Perfect angular resolution is not always possible for outerplanar graphs, because vertices on the convex hull of the drawing with degree greater than one cannot have their incident edges equally spaced around them.

Planar graphs
More precisely, Wegner conjectured in 1977 that the chromatic number of the square of a planar graph is at most , and it is known that the chromatic number is at most . However, the drawings resulting from this technique are generally not planar.

Additionally, such a drawing may be forced to use very long edges, longer by an exponential factor than the shortest edges in the drawing.

Computational complexity
It is NP-hard to determine whether a given graph of maximum degree  has a drawing with angular resolution , even in the special case that  . However, for certain restricted classes of drawings, including drawings of trees in which extending the leaves to infinity produces a convex subdivision of the plane as well as drawings of planar graphs in which each bounded face is a centrally-symmetric polygon, a drawing of optimal angular resolution may be found in polynomial time.

History

Although originally defined only for straight-line drawings of graphs, later authors have also investigated the angular resolution of drawings in which the edges are polygonal chains, circular arcs, or spline curves.

The angular resolution of a graph is closely related to its crossing resolution, the angle formed by crossings in a drawing of the graph. In particular, RAC drawing seeks to ensure that these angles are all right angles, the largest crossing angle possible.

Notes

References

.
.
.
.
.
.
.
.
.
.
.
.
.
.
.
.

Graph drawing